Lyabovo is a rural locality (a village) in Dobryansky District, Perm Krai, Russia. The population was 32 as of 2010. There are 9 streets.

Geography 
Lyabovo is located 5 km southwest of Dobryanka (the district's administrative centre) by road. Rassokhi is the nearest rural locality.

References 

Rural localities in Dobryansky District